Actias gnoma, also known as the Japanese moon moth, is a moth in the family Saturniidae The species was first described by Arthur Gardiner Butler in 1877. It is found in Japan and the Russian Far East.

Adults are light greenish blue with a raised and sparse scale cover. A single postmedial fascia is found on the forewings. The eyes are small, mostly with a fine black frame (although this is sometimes absent). The inner half of the eye is narrower than the outer one. The apex of the hindwings is usually pointed.

Subspecies
Actias gnoma gnoma (Butler, 1877)
Actias gnoma mandschurica (Staudinger, 1892)
Actias gnoma miyatai Inoue, 1976 (Japan: Hachijō-jima)

References

Gnoma
Moths described in 1877
Moths of Asia